The Santa Fe Passenger Depot, also known as Fresno station, is an historic railroad station and transportation hub in downtown Fresno, California. It is served by San Joaquins inter-city passenger trains, Greyhound inter-city buses, and regional transit services including Fresno Area Express and the Fresno County Rural Transit Agency.

History 

The station was built in 1899 for the San Francisco and San Joaquin Valley Railroad (SF&SJV) and was designed by William Benson Storey for the Atchison, Topeka and Santa Fe Railway (ATSF or Santa Fe). It is very similar to the Stockton – San Joaquin Street Station. The station was once the Santa Fe's Valley Division Headquarters, and was expanded or renovated nine times between 1908 and 1985. Santa Fe closed the station for passenger service in 1966 and completely shuttered the building in the early 1990s. When passenger service to Fresno was reinstated on 5 March 1974 Amtrak used a space in the nearby freight house. By the time the city of Fresno purchased the station in 2003, it had fallen into disrepair. The station reopened on 12 February 2005 after a  renovation project largely restored it to its original 1899 appearance. After renovations there are now is  dedicated to passenger service and another  available for lease. The Santa Fe Depot was added to the National Register of Historic Places in 1976.

From its beginning until Amtrak took over nearly all passenger rail service within the United States in 1971, the station was served by ATSF trains, including the famous San Francisco Chief and the Oakland-Barstow line. For the first few years after Amtrak's inception Fresno had no rail service. In 1974 service by Amtrak/Amtrak California's San Joaquin began. Initially, service only included daily service (once in each direction) between Oakland and Bakersfield. Originally, the next northbound stop was Merced, but by 1978 the Storey Train Station was added. (However, under Amtrak that station was known as Madera, rather than Storey.) As the years went by service increased substantially and by 2002 the San Joaquin ran twice daily (in each direction) between Sacramento and Bakersfield and four times daily (in each direction) between Oakland and Bakersfield.

Description 
The station is located at 2650 Tulare Street, just off Santa Fe Street, across the street from Fresno City Hall. It is situated in the middle of a rough triangle formed by the three freeways in the city (California State Route 99,  California State Route 41, and California State Route 180) and is easily accessible from all three.

In ,  passengers boarded or detrained at Fresno station. Excluding passengers who are transferring to a Thruway Bus, Fresno has the highest ridership on the San Joaquins service.

Facilities 
The station has an indoor waiting room open from 5:30 am to 10:00 pm daily. Inside the station there is a ticket counter with baggage check services. In addition to the ticketing agent, there is a Quik-Trak automated ticket kiosk. There is also a bathroom and payphone. The station has 11 short term and 98 long term parking spaces.

Notable nearby destinations 
Chukchansi Park
Fresno City Hall
Fresno Convention Center
Meux Home Museum
Saroyan Theater
Selland Arena

Services

Train platforms 
The Santa Fe passenger depot has two tracks, but only one side platform sees regular service. Amtrak trains switch onto this track just north or south of the station, leaving the Main Line clear for freight trains. There is a very narrow island platform between the tracks that is occasionally used when Amtrak trains are not able to switch onto the station track. Passengers are not allowed to wait on the island platform.

Bus connections 
 Amtrak Thruway: 1 to Los Angeles via Bakersfield 
 Fresno Area Express: 22
 Fresno County Rural Transit Agency: Coalinga, Orange Cove, Southeast, Westside
 Greyhound Lines

References

External links 

Fresno, CA – USA RailGuide (TrainWeb)

Fresno
Buildings and structures in Fresno, California
Amtrak Thruway Motorcoach stations in Fresno County, California
Fresno
Transportation in Fresno, California
Railway stations in the United States opened in 1899
Railway stations on the National Register of Historic Places in California
National Register of Historic Places in Fresno County, California
1890s architecture in the United States
Mission Revival architecture in California
Railway stations closed in 1966
Railway stations in the United States opened in 1974
Railway stations in Fresno County, California